Agreements and declarations resulting from meetings in Paris include:

Listed by name

Paris Accords
may refer to:
 Paris Accords, the agreements reached at the end of the London and Paris Conferences in 1954 concerning the post-war status of Germany. [For parallel conferences for peace in Korea and in Indochina, see Berlin Conference (1954) and 1954 Geneva Conference]
 Paris Peace Accords, in 1973, ending United States involvement in the Vietnam War
 Paris Agreement, the 2015 agreement related to the United Nations Framework Convention on Climate Change, sometimes called the Paris Accords

Paris Agreement[s] 
may refer to:

 Paris Agreements about the status of West Germany reached at the London and Paris Conferences in 1954. [For parallel conferences for peace in Korea and in Indochina, see Berlin Conference (1954) and 1954 Geneva Conference]
 Paris Agreement, international treaty on climate change, adopted in 2015

Paris Charter 
refers to the Charter of Paris for a New Europe (1990), which helped to found the Organization for Security and Co-operation in Europe (OSCE)

Paris Convention 
may refer to:

 Paris Convention for the Protection of Industrial Property (1883)
 Paris Convention of 1919, regarding international aerial navigation
 Paris Convention on Third Party Liability in the Field of Nuclear Energy (1960)

Paris Conference 
may refer to:

Paris Conference on Passports & Customs Formalities and Through Tickets (1920)
Paris Economic Conference (1916) 
Paris Peace Accords (1973)
 2015 United Nations Climate Change Conference, held in Paris

Paris Peace Conference
may refer to:

 Congress of Paris (1856), negotiations ending the Crimean War
 Treaty of Paris (1898), an agreement that involved Spain ceding Puerto Rico, Guam, and the Philippines to the United States
 Paris Peace Conference (1919–1920), negotiations ending World War I 
 Paris Peace Treaties, 1947, which ended World War II for most nations
 Paris Peace Accords, 1973 treaty ending American involvement in the Vietnam War
 The Paris Peace Conference on Cambodia (July 1989 - October 1991), which resolved Cambodia–China relations
 Paris Peace Forum, an event first held in 2018

Paris Principles 
may refer to:

 Paris Principles (cataloging) (PP), international conference and resolution on bibliographical cataloging standard principles in 1961
 Paris Principles (human rights standards), international workshop on National Institutions for the Promotion and Protection of Human Rights in 1991
 "The Paris Principles: Principles and guidelines on children associated with armed forces or armed groups", see Free Children from War conference in 2007

Paris Protocol[s] 
may refer to:

 Paris Protocols, agreement between Nazi Germany and Vichy France in 1941
 Paris Protocol (1952), status of NATO headquarters
 Protocol on Economic Relations, agreement between Israel and the Palestinian Authority in 1994

Listed by date

	1856	* Congress of Paris (1856), negotiations ending the Crimean War
	1883	* Paris Convention for the Protection of Industrial Property (1883)
	1898	* Treaty of Paris (1898), an agreement that involved Spain ceding Puerto Rico, Guam, and the Philippines to the United States
	1916	* Paris Economic Conference (1916) 
	1919	* Paris Convention of 1919, regarding international aerial navigation
	1919–1920	* Paris Peace Conference (1919–1920), negotiations ending World War I 
	1920	* Paris Conference on Passports & Customs Formalities and Through Tickets (1920)
	1941	* Paris Protocols, agreement between Nazi Germany and Vichy France in 1941
	1947	* Paris Peace Treaties, 1947, which ended World War II for most nations
	1952	* Paris Protocol (1952), status of NATO headquarters
	1954	* Paris Accords, the agreements reached at the end of the London and Paris Conferences in 1954 concerning the post-war status of Germany 
	1960	* Paris Convention on Third Party Liability in the Field of Nuclear Energy (1960)
	1961	* Paris Principles (cataloging) (PP), international conference and resolution on bibliographical cataloging standard principles in 1961
	1973	* Paris Peace Accords, 1973 treaty ending United States involvement in the Vietnam War
	1989–1991	* The Paris Peace Conference on Cambodia (July 1989 - October 1991), which resolved Cambodia–China relations
	1990	* Paris Charter refers to the Charter of Paris for a New Europe (1990), which helped to found the Organization for Security and Co-operation in Europe (OSCE)
	1991	* Paris Principles (human rights standards), international workshop on National Institutions for the Promotion and Protection of Human Rights in 1991
	1994	* Protocol on Economic Relations, agreement between Israel and the Palestinian Authority in 1994
	2007	* "The Paris Principles: Principles and guidelines on children associated with armed forces or armed groups", see Free Children from War conference in 2007
	2015	* Paris Agreement, the 2015 agreement related to the United Nations Framework Convention on Climate Change, sometimes called the Paris Accords
	2018	* Paris Peace Forum, an event first held in 2018

See also
 Treaty of Paris (disambiguation)
 Treaty of Versailles (disambiguation)
 Paris Commune of 1871
 Paris Commune (1789–1795)